The D-class submarine was the Royal Navy's first class of submarines capable of operating significantly beyond coastal waters. They were also the first boats to be fitted with wireless transmitters. Ten were laid down between 1907 and 1910, though only 8 were completed as D-class boats. The final two hulls were completed as British E-class submarine.

Design and description
The patrol submarines evolved from the C-class boats. They were designed to be propelled by diesel motors on the surface to avoid the problems with petrol engines experienced with the A class.

D-class boats were fitted with twin screws for greater manoeuvrability and were fitted with saddle tanks. The D class were the first submarines to be equipped with deck guns forward of the conning tower beginning with D6. Also, reserve buoyancy was increased to 20.6%. Armament also included three  torpedo tubes (2 vertically in the bow and 1 in the stern). The D class was also the first class of British submarines to have standard radio fitted. The aerial was attached to the mast of the conning tower that was lowered before diving.

With their enlarged bridge structure the boat profile was recognisably that of the modern submarine. The D-class submarines were considered to be so innovative that the prototype, D1, was built in utmost secrecy in a securely guarded building shed. She was launched at Barrow with equal secrecy, with only departmental heads and a few officers from the cruiser , that was currently in dock being present. Once moved to the fitting out berth, she was once again screened from view.

The boats cost between £79,910 and £89,410 each excluding the deck gun.

Operations
The D class were based at Harwich, Immingham, Blyth and Dover. Their wartime role was to sink German warships. In the latter stages of World War I the D class were used for training crews based at Portsmouth.

During World War I the boats patrolled the North Sea and the Heligoland Bight, and protected cross channel troopships. During the war, four boats (D2, D3, D5, and D6) were lost, and the remainder (D4, D7, and D8) were paid off in July 1919.

Boats

Eight D-class boats were built:
 
 
 
 
 
 
 
 

See also
 Not to be confused with the United States D-class submarine of 1909-1910.

References

Works cited

External links

RN Subs 1907 - 1919: D Class
MaritimeQuest D Class Overview

Submarine classes